Pennsylvania Route 246 (PA 246) is an  state highway located in McKean County in Pennsylvania.  The western terminus is at PA 46 in Corwins Corners.  The eastern terminus is at PA 346 in Prentisvale.

Route description

PA 246 begins at an intersection with PA 46 in the community of Corwins Corners in Foster Township, heading east-northeast on two-lane undivided Looker Mountain Trail. The road passes wooded homes surrounded by forested mountains, running through the community of Dallas City. The route winds east through more forested areas as it comes into Otto Township and crosses PA 646 in the community of Summit. Past this intersection, PA 246 continues southeast through more mountainous areas. Upon reaching the residential community of Rixford, the route makes a turn to the northeast and heads into a mix of farmland and rural homes. PA 246 continues east through more rural areas to its eastern terminus at PA 346 in the community of Prentisvale.

Major intersections

See also

References

External links

Pennsylvania Highways: PA 246

246
Transportation in McKean County, Pennsylvania